Elsamni is a surname. Notable people with the surname include:

Ibrahim Elsamni, Egyptian international footballer
Osama Elsamni (born 1988), Egyptian-Japanese footballer